The Elm Place–Duffield Street station was a station on the demolished BMT Fulton Street Line in Brooklyn, New York City. The Fulton Street Elevated was built by the Kings County Elevated Railway Company and this station started service on April 24, 1888. The station had 2 tracks and 2 offset side platforms. It was served by trains of the BMT Fulton Street Line, and until 1920, trains of the BMT Brighton Line. This station was served by steam locomotives between 1888 and 1899. In 1898, the Brooklyn Rapid Transit Company (BRT) absorbed the Kings County Elevated Railway, and it took over the Fulton Street El, and it was electrified on July 3, 1899.  It closed on June 1, 1940, when all service from Fulton Ferry and Park Row to Rockaway Avenue was abandoned, as it came under city ownership. Current rapid transit service at these intersections consists of entrances to the Hoyt Street subway station on the IRT Eastern Parkway Line built in 1908.

References

Defunct BMT Fulton Street Line stations
Railway stations in the United States opened in 1888
Railway stations closed in 1940
Former elevated and subway stations in Brooklyn
1888 establishments in New York (state)
1940 disestablishments in New York (state)